Lubin is a surname. Notable people with the name include:

 Arthur Lubin (1898–1995), American film producer of Abbott and Costello comedies
 Barry Lubin, American
 Dan Lubin
 David Lubin
 Erickson Lubin, American boxer
 Frank Lubin (1910–1999), Lithuanian-American basketball player
 Germaine Lubin, French
 Gilson Lubin
 Harry Lubin, American composer and arranger
 Jonathan Lubin, mathematician
 Joseph Lubin (accountant), American
 Joseph Lubin (entrepreneur)
Lior Lubin (born 1979), Israeli basketball player and coach
 Saint Lubin, also known as Leobinus
 Siegmund Lubin (1851–1923), Berman-American motion picture pioneer and founder of Lubin Film Studios
 Simon J. Lubin (1876–1936), American businessman and political activist.
 Steven Lubin, American
 Thierry Lubin, French